Domingo Francisco Juan Esteban "Dom" Orejudos, Secundo (July 1, 1933 – September 24, 1991), also widely known by the pen names Etienne and Stephen, was an openly gay artist, ballet dancer, and choreographer, best known for his ground-breaking masculine gay male erotica beginning in the 1950s. Along with artists George Quaintance and Touko Laaksonen ("Tom of Finland") – with whom he became friends – Orejudos' leather-themed art promoted an image of gay men as strong and masculine, as an alternative to the then-dominant stereotype as weak and effeminate. With his first lover and business partner Chuck Renslow, Orejudos established many landmarks of late-20th-century gay male culture, including the Gold Coast bar, Man's Country Baths, the International Mr. Leather competition, Chicago's August White Party, and the magazines Triumph, Rawhide, and Mars. He was also active and influential in the Chicago ballet community.

Ballet
Dom Orejudos was born in Chicago, where he attended McKinley High School, played violin in the school orchestra, served as concertmaster in the All Chicago High School orchestra, and competed on the gymnastics team. He studied drawing and art at the Art Institute, attended Ellis-DuBoulay School of Ballet on a scholarship, and then joined the Illinois Ballet Company, where he was principal dancer for nine years and became resident choreographer. After the Illinois Ballet closed in 1972, he created new choreography for another decade working with the Delta Festival Ballet company in New Orleans, LA. He created 18 ballets, staged by 20 regional ballet companies including Washington, D.C., Atlanta, Houston, Minneapolis, San Francisco, and Omaha. He received three grants from the National Endowment for the Arts. He staged his ballet Charioteer to inaugurate color broadcasts by Chicago station WTTW, which received three Emmy Awards. He danced in the touring companies for West Side Story, The King and I, and Song of Norway.

Art

Orejudos attended the School of the Art Institute of Chicago for a semester, but was frustrated by the approach taught there. When he was 20 years old, he was approached on Chicago's Oak Street Beach by Chuck Renslow (then 23), inviting him to model for photographs. They began a relationship. They also founded Kris Studios, a physique photography studio that took photos for gay magazines they published. The studio was named in part to honor transgender pioneer Christine Jorgensen. Orejudos began drawing commercially in 1953, when he was commissioned to draw erotic illustrations for Tomorrow's Man, a magazine published by Irv Johnson, the owner of the gym where he worked out. He adopted the pen name Etienne, the French equivalent of his middle name Esteban. He signed pen-and-ink drawings done in a slightly different style with Stephen, the English equivalent of his middle name, to imply that the studio employed multiple artists. The latter kind of drawings became the basis for storybooks, among the first explicit homoerotic comics published.

In 1958, Orejudos and Renslow bought the gym from Johnson, which they renamed Triumph Gymnasium and Health Studio, moving the photography studio to an upper floor. In 1963 they expanded their publishing enterprise to launch Mars, an overtly leather-focused magazine. They also produced non-explicit gay-themed 16mm movie shorts, written and directed by Orejudos. After losing much of his archive in a plumbing flood in the 1970s, he gave the remainder of it to Target Studio, which became his primary publisher. In 1978, he had a joint gallery exhibition in San Francisco with erotic artist Al Shapiro (A. Jay).

Orejudos' art was exhibited at the Mary and Leigh Block Museum of Art at Northwestern University, the Chicago History Museum, and the School of the Art Institute's Roger Brown Study Collection Center.

Personal life

In addition to his relationship with Chuck Renslow, in 1969 Orejudos met Robert (Bob) Yuhnke at a leather party in Manhattan. They developed a long distance relationship until Bob moved to Chicago in 1979 to live with Orejudos. Together they established a residence in Eldorado Springs, Colorado, in 1980, where they resided until Orejudos' death from complications of AIDS. Orejudos continued to spend time in Chicago until his mother's death in 1984.

Orejudos contracted pneumonia during travel with Bob in China before joining other members of a Sister City delegation from Boulder for a planned visit to Lhasa Tibet in 1987. This illness revealed a diagnosis of AIDS which contributed to his declining health, leading to his death from AIDS complications on September 24, 1991. Orejudos has been honored with three separate panels in the AIDS Memorial quilt.

Legacy
In 1993 Orejudos received the Forebear Award as part of the Pantheon of Leather Awards.

In 2013 Orejudos was inducted into the Leather Hall of Fame.

The Leather Archives and Museum has the largest collection of original works by Orejudos under the name “Etienne”. It has the Etienne auditorium, which has numerous murals done by Orejudos.

He is among those commemorated in the AIDS Memorial Quilt.

References

External links
 Lambiek Comiclopedia.
Dom Orejudos Papers at the Newberry Library

1933 births
1991 deaths
AIDS-related deaths in Colorado
American erotic artists
American male ballet dancers
American comics artists
Fetish artists
American gay artists
Gay male BDSM
Gay male erotica artists
Leather subculture
Physique photography
LGBT choreographers
LGBT comics creators
LGBT people from Illinois
Pseudonymous artists
LGBT Hispanic and Latino American people
20th-century American LGBT people
20th-century American ballet dancers
Inductees of the Chicago LGBT Hall of Fame